Romance in Manhattan is a 1935 American comedy/romance film directed by Stephen Roberts, starring Francis Lederer and Ginger Rogers, and released by RKO Radio Pictures.

Plot 
Karel Novak (Lederer), an incredibly naive Czech immigrant, arrives in New York with $58; but now he must have $200 or be sent back. Novak escapes from the ship and is rescued by dock workers; but he loses his money. He wanders the streets and eats food left by chorus girls. Sylvia Dennis (Rogers) questions him. He refuses money but wants a job. Two women suggest an institution for Sylvia's brother Frank (Jimmy Butler), because he missed two days of school. Sylvia says no. Sylvia gives Karel blankets to sleep on the roof, and she explains about the Depression. Frank shares his job selling newspapers with Karel and takes over after school. Karel does not admit he was fished out of the river and so does not get his $58 back. He asks the police officer Murphy (J. Farrell MacDonald) if someone could get in trouble for helping someone if they didn't know he was an illegal alien.

Karel shows Sylvia his taxi; but she says her show has closed. He is glad to be the head of the house for his friend. Karel comes home early because of a strike and helps Sylvia with the washing. She hopes to marry a rich man; but he kisses her. The two women ask the landlady if Novak is living in Sylvia's apartment. Sylvia goes to court for Frank. The judge (Oscar Apfel) says she is 19 and asks about Novak, who explains the situation is innocent. The judge says Sylvia must give up Frank to an institution until she is married.

Frank packs; Karel walks out, and Sylvia cries. Karel goes to Murphy and asks how to get married. Murphy says he only needs $2 and maybe his naturalization papers. So Karel goes to attorney Halsey J. Pander (Arthur Hohl), who asks for $50 and promises to make him a citizen right away. Karel goes back to drive a taxi even though he gets beat up because of the strike. Sylvia tells Karel that she and Frank are leaving. Karel asks her to marry him. Sylvia says no but changes her mind. A man comes to take Frank. Karel tells Sylvia he is in the country illegally but expects to be made a citizen. Karel is arrested, as Pander is turning him in for money. Murphy intervenes, and the police sergeant (Sidney Toler) makes calls to arrange a marriage license and to hire a minister (Donald Meek). Murphy arrests Pander for speeding and calls a friend in Immigration. At the police station, Pander's arraignment for drunk driving and assorted other made-up offenses, the over-the-phone immigration paperwork, filling out the marriage license, and a doctor's physical examination and vaccination of Karel, and the wedding itself, all take place simultaneously, with comic pauses and interruptions. The ceremony is at last completed, and Karel and Sylvia are married.

Credited cast 
 Francis Lederer as Karel Novak
 Ginger Rogers as Sylvia Dennis
 Arthur Hohl as Halsey J. Pander
 Jimmy Butler as Frank Dennis
 J. Farrell MacDonald as Officer Murphy
 Helen Ware as Miss Anthrop
 Lillian Harmer as Mrs. Schultz (Landlady)
 Eily Malyon as Miss Evans
 Donald Meek as the Minister
 Sidney Toler as the Police Sergeant
 Oscar Apfel as the Judge
 Reginald Barlow as the Customs Inspector

See also 
 List of American films of 1935

References

External links 
 
 
 Romance in Manhattan at TCM Movie Database
 

1935 films
American black-and-white films
Films directed by Stephen Roberts
Films set in New York City
1935 romantic comedy films
American romantic comedy films
Films about illegal immigration to the United States
RKO Pictures films
1930s English-language films
1930s American films